The Tokyo Hachioji Bee Trains is a professional basketball team that competes in the third division of the Japanese B.League.

Coaches
François Peronnet
Masaki Hayamizu
Takatoshi Ishibashi
Miodrag Rajković
Marko Filipovic
Keisuke Hirose

Roster

Notable players

Cleanthony Early
Carl Hall
Alex Jones
Edward Morris
Shaquille Morris
Le'Bryan Nash
Jordan Richard
Jordan Bowling
Marcellus Sommerville
Kenta Tateyama
Niyokwizera Yves (fr)

Arenas
Ésforta Arena Hachiōji
Katayanagi Arena
Kofu General Citizens Hall
Fuji Hokuroku Park Gymnasium
Kaneyama Sports Center

U15
Bee Trains has a U-15 youth team.

References

External links

Basketball teams in Japan
Sports teams in Tokyo
Hachiōji, Tokyo
Basketball teams established in 2012
2012 establishments in Japan